Gerhard Lichtenfeld (6 November 1921 – 6 November 1978) was a German sculptor and academic teacher, whose works were installed in public space in the Halle (Saale) and Merseburg districts, and who exhibited internationally. He was awarded the Handel Prize.

Life 

Lichtenfeld was born in Halle (Saale). During service in the Reichsarbeitsdienst, he had an accident in 1940 and lost his left underarm. He studied law, as his father wished, at the University of Halle from 1942 to 1945. After World War II, he worked as a construction labourer.

He then worked as assistant of Weidanz. From 1959, he directed the sculptors' class at the institute, now called Hochschule für industrielle Formgestaltung Halle – Burg Giebichenstein (now: Burg Giebichenstein University of Art and Design). He was a lecturer there from 1964, and professor in 1966.

He designed the layout of the central cemetery in Merseburg, and was a consultant for the Merseburg and Halle districts for municipipal design. Several of his works were installed in public space. He took part in international exhibitions.

Lichtenberg died in Halle on his 57th birthday. A street in Halle is named after him.

Awards 
Lichtenfeld was awarded the Handel Prize of the Halle Bezirk in 1963 and 1970, the Kunstpreis (Art prize) of the town in 1971, and the National Prize of the German Democratic Republic in 1974.

Further reading 
 Vollmer 6, page 209
 Gerhard Lichtenfeld / Plastik und Grafik, catalogue, Schloss Mosigkau Dessau 1971
 Gerhard Lichtenfeld / Plastik und Zeichnungen, Halle: Staatliche Galerie Moritzburg, 1979
 Medaillenkunst in Halle im 20.Jahrhundert, eds. Martin Heidemann and Wolfgang Steguweit, Berlin 2002, Deutsche Gesellschaft für Medaillenkunst, Gebr. Mann Verlag, 
  Burg Giebichenstein / Die hallesche Kunstschule von den Anfängen bis zur Gegenwart, 1992, Halle and Karlsruhe, 
  Das Phänomen des Raumes / Auf den Spuren hallescher Bildhauertradition, 2010, Halle, Kunstverein Talstrasse and Kunstforum Halle,

References

External links 

 
 Lichtenfeld, Gerhard ZWAB
 Gerhard Lichtenfeld / Werke im Raum Merseburg (in German) Merseburg
 Gerhard Lichtenfeld / Werke im Raum Halle (Saale) (in German) Halle (Saale) 

1921 births
1978 deaths
People from Halle (Saale)
German medallists
Recipients of the National Prize of East Germany
Handel Prize winners
Reich Labour Service members